Anthotopos may refer to two settlements in Greece:

Anthotopos, Kozani, a village in the Kozani regional unit
Anthotopos, Magnesia, a village in the municipality of Almyros, Magnesia